Erik Johannes Marais (born 24 November 1982) is a South African politician, currently a Member of Parliament for the Democratic Alliance, and the Shadow Deputy Minister of Public Enterprises.

References

Offices held 

Living people
Democratic Alliance (South Africa) politicians
Members of the National Assembly of South Africa
People from the Western Cape
Politicians from the Western Cape
1982 births